Dane Reynolds (born September 7, 1985 in Long Beach, California) is an American professional surfer from Ventura, California.  He is known for his "go for broke" style of surfing that includes many experimental and aerial maneuvers.

Biography 
Reynolds started surfing at the age of 10 after he moved from Bakersfield, California to Ventura.  It was here on the point breaks around Santa Barbara and Ventura that he honed his progressive style of surfing. Reynolds first started competing at age 13 and at 16 had dropped out of school to surf.

Reynolds competed in the 2003 and 2004 X-Games and received the highest single wave score both years. The 2008 ASP World Tour marked his rookie year on the esteemed tour after finishing 2nd on the ASP World Qualifying Series (WQS) behind Jordy Smith. His ranking on the WCT in 2008 was 19th with 4066 points, then he moved up to the coveted "Top Ten" (10th) in 2009 with 5219 points.
In 2010 Reynolds had a breakout year, ending up tied for fourth in the 2010 ASP World Tour with Taj Burrow.
His 2011 tour started disappointly missing the first three events due to a knee injury.

Reynold's first video, "First Chapter", won Best Male Performance in a Video and Video of the Year at the 2006 Surfer Poll Awards.

Major sponsors of Dane Reynolds include Channel Islands,

Dane Reynolds started Summer Teeth with his manager Blair Marlin. It was started as a kitschy beach gear brand, they now produce t-shirts and other apparel.

In August 2012, Reynolds was inducted into the Surfers' Hall of Fame in Huntington Beach, California.

In late 2011 Dane distinguished himself from other pro surfers by shaping his own surfboard called the Channel Islands Sperm Whale. Rob Machado and others have created their own surfboards as well, instead of relying on a surfboard shaper.

In November 2015, Reynolds parted ways with his long time clothing sponsor, Quiksilver.

In February 2017, Dane Reynolds launched a new clothing company called Former. The company was originally founded by Reynolds, professional surfer Craig Anderson, and professional skateboarders Dylan Rieder and Austyn Gillette. Former is "independently owned and operated, with the intention of creating, designing, and producing what we like to wear and be a part of." Former put out a promotional video of Reynolds called Premium Violence in conjunction with the release of the company's second collection of apparel in September 2017.

Films
 Damage inc.
 First Chapter
 Young Guns
 Young Guns 2
 Young Guns 3
 Dude Cruise
 Stranger Than Fiction
 Days of the Strange
 The Present
 The Collection
 Modern Collective
 Castles in the Sky
 The Union Express
 Thrills Spills And What Not
 Lost Atlas
 Dear Suburbia
 Slow Dance (Director/Producer)
 Loaded
 Cluster
 Lost Interest
 Chapter 11
 Premium Violence

References

External links
 Reynold's bio page on Quiksilver.com
 Dane's blog: travel, music, art and surfing 
 ASP Surfer Profile
 Channel Islands Sperm Whale

1985 births
Living people
Sportspeople from Long Beach, California
American surfers
World Surf League surfers